Big Salmon River Suspension Bridge is a suspension footbridge in New Brunswick, Canada. It measures 84m in length. It spans the Big Salmon River, a small river which flows into the Bay of Fundy near St. Martins, New Brunswick.

History
Before the suspension bridge was built, a covered bridge existed in its place.

References 

Bridges in New Brunswick
Suspension bridges in Canada
Pedestrian bridges in Canada